Bibasilaris trisulcata is a species of snout moth. It was described by Warren in 1891. It is found in Costa Rica.

References

Moths described in 1891
Epipaschiinae